Bolitoglossa cataguana, also known as the Cataguana salamander, is a species of salamander in the family Plethodontidae. It is endemic to Honduras and known from near Cataguana in the Marale municipality, Francisco Morazán Department.

Description
There are 13 costal grooves. The sub-digital pads are well-developed and the toe tips are bluntly rounded.

Habitat and conservation
Individuals were found active in vegetation up to 3 metres above the ground or resting during the daytime under a log. Coloration may vary by time of the day; during the daytime, the holotype was dorsally gray-brown with pale ocher cast and scattered dark brown punctations, whereas at the night it was pale grayish tan with pale pink cast.

Bolitoglossa cataguana is probably endemic to the Montaña de Yoro National Park. Its small range, rarity, and the threat posed by habitat loss caused by agricultural expansion, including marijuana plantations, warrant its listing as "critically endangered".

References

cataguana
Endemic fauna of Honduras
Amphibians of Honduras
Amphibians described in 2009